Peng Qi is a fictional character in Water Margin, one of the Four Great Classical Novels in Chinese literature. Nicknamed "General of Heavenly Vision", he ranks 43rd among the 108 Stars of Destiny and seventh among the 72 Earthly Fiends.

Background
A native of Dongjing (東京; present-day Kaifeng, Henan), the imperial capital of the Song Empire, Peng Qi is descended from generations of military men. He himself serves as a military instructor in Yingzhou (in present-day Anhui province). As he fights with a trident with three Spikes and two Blades, he is nicknamed "General of Heavenly Vision", an allusion to the three-eyed deity Erlang who uses a similar weapon.

Becoming an outlaw
After Liangshan defeated and killed Gao Lian, the governor of Gaotangzhou (高唐州; present-day Gaotang County, Shandong) to rescue Chai Jin, Emperor Huizong appoints the general Huyan Zhuo at the recommendation of Grand Marshal Gao Qiu, who is Gao Lian's cousin, to command an army to stamp out the stronghold. Huyan in turn asks for Han Tao and Peng Qi to be his lieutenants.

In the first clash with Liangshan, Huyan Zhuo and his two assistants run into a marathon fight with a succession of Liangshan warriors. Peng Qi comes to face Hu Sanniang. Not knowing that the amazon is a good thrower of lasso, Peng Qi is engrossed in parrying her sabres that he is caught off-guard when she hurls her noose. Blocked by Hu and Sun Li, Huyan Zhuo could not rescue him. He sends out his cavalry consisting of groups of chain-linked armoured horses, which charge forth in combined ferocity. Overwhelmed, the outlaws hole up in Liangshan with the marsh as buffer as they work out a counter-attack.

Brought before Song Jiang, Peng Qi is moved by the warm respect accorded him by the Liangshan leader that he agrees to join the stronghold. When Ling Zhen, an artillery officer specially sent on request by Huyan to come shell Liangshan with cannons, is also captured, Peng Qi succeeds in persuading him to switch allegiance.

Tang Long recommends that his cousin Xu Ning could beat Huyan's cavalry with his expertise in hooked lance. After being trained by Xu, who is recruited through an elaborate trick, the hooked lancer squad of Liangshan fell the cavalry of Huayan routing his force. Captured, Han Tao also surrenders upon the advice of Peng Qi.

Campaigns and death
Peng Qi is appointed as one of the leaders of the Liangshan cavalry after the 108 Stars of Destiny came together in what is called the Grand Assembly. He participates in the campaigns against the Liao invaders and rebel forces in Song territory following amnesty from Emperor Huizong for Liangshan.

In the attack on Changzhou in the campaign against Fang La, Peng Qi and Han Tao encounter Gao Keli and Zhang Jinren. After Han is killed by the two, Peng is determined on revenge but is fatally stabbed at his side by Zhang Jinren.

References
 
 
 
 
 
 
 

72 Earthly Fiends
Fictional characters from Henan